Dickinson Theodore Roosevelt Regional Airport , formerly Dickinson Municipal Airport, is six miles south of Dickinson, in Stark County, North Dakota. It is owned by the Dickinson Airport Authority.

The airport serves western North Dakota, eastern Montana and northwest South Dakota, home to Theodore Roosevelt National Park. The airport sees one airline, United Express, flying an Embraer Regional-Jet (ERJ) to Denver; Delta Connection flew to Minneapolis-St. Paul until November 30, 2015. The first airline flights were Frontier DC-3s in 1959.

Federal Aviation Administration records say the airport had 9,164 passenger boardings (enplanements) in calendar year 2008, 8,924 in 2009 and 10,383 in 2010.

The Federal Aviation Administration (FAA) National Plan of Integrated Airport Systems for 2021–2025 categorized it as a non-hub primary commercial service facility.

The airport is named for Theodore Roosevelt, Jr., the 26th President of the United States.

Facilities

The airport covers 626 acres (253 ha) at an elevation of 2,592 feet (790 m). It has two runways: 7/25 is an asphalt runway that is 4,700 by 75 feet (1,433 x 23 m) and 15/35 is a concrete runway that is 7,301 by 100 feet (2,225 x 30 m), this runway is temporary while runway 14/32 is rebuilt.

In the year ending October 25, 2019 the airport had 17,114 aircraft operations, average 47 per day: 85% general aviation, 9% airline, 6% air taxi, and <1% military. In October 2021, 34 aircraft were based at the airport: 28 single-engine, 4 multi-engine, 1 jet, and 1 helicopter.

On April 30, 2020 a FAA Airport Improvement Program grant of $5,388,889 was awarded to rebuild and extend runway 14/32.

Airline and destination

Passenger

United Express uses CRJ200s operated by SkyWest Airlines

Cargo

Statistics

References

Other sources

 Essential Air Service documents (Docket OST-1995-697) from the U.S. Department of Transportation:
 Order 2005-1-9: selecting Great Lakes Aviation, Ltd., to provide small community air service with Embraer Brasilia aircraft at Dickinson, North Dakota, for two years for an annual subsidy rate of $1,697,248.
 Order 2006-11-21: re-selecting Great Lakes Aviation, Ltd., operating as both a United Airlines and Frontier code-share partner, to provide subsidized essential air service (EAS) at Dickinson, North Dakota, for an annual subsidy rate of $1,696,977, for the two-year period of February 1, 2007, through January 31, 2009.
 Order 2008-10-24: re-selecting Great Lakes Aviation, Ltd., operating as both a Frontier Airlines and United Airlines code-share partner, to provide subsidized essential air service (EAS) at Dickinson, North Dakota, for an annual subsidy rate of $2,274,177, for the two-year period of February 1, 2009, through January 31, 2011.
 Order 2010-11-16: re-selecting Great Lakes Aviation, Ltd., operating as both a Frontier Airlines and United Airlines code-share partner, to provide subsidized essential air service (EAS) at Dickinson, North Dakota, for an annual subsidy rate of $2,019,177, for the two-year period of February 1, 2011, through January 31, 2013.

External links
 Aerial image as of June 1995 from USGS The National Map
 

Airports in North Dakota
Essential Air Service
Buildings and structures in Stark County, North Dakota
Dickinson, North Dakota